Ypthima lamto, the Lamto ringlet, is a butterfly in the family Nymphalidae. It is found in Ivory Coast, central Ghana and Cameroon. The habitat probably consists of forest-savanna mosaic.

References

lamto
Butterflies of Africa
Butterflies described in 1982